Logarithmic decrement, is used to find the damping ratio of an underdamped system in the time domain.

The method of logarithmic decrement becomes less and less precise as the damping ratio increases past about 0.5; it does not apply at all for a damping ratio greater than 1.0 because the system is overdamped.

Method
The logarithmic decrement is defined as the natural log of the ratio of the amplitudes of any two successive peaks:

 

The damping ratio is then found from the logarithmic decrement by:

 

Thus logarithmic decrement also permits evaluation of the Q factor  of the system:

 
 

The damping ratio can then be used to find the natural frequency ωn of vibration of the system from the damped natural frequency ωd:

 
 
where T, the period of the waveform, is the time between two successive amplitude peaks of the underdamped system.

Simplified variation
The damping ratio can be found for any two adjacent peaks.  This method is used when  and is derived from the general method above:
 
 

where x0 and x1 are amplitudes of any two successive peaks.

For system where  (not too close to the critically damped regime, where ).

Method of fractional overshoot
The method of fractional overshoot can be useful for damping ratios between about 0.5 and 0.8.  The fractional overshoot  is:

 

where xp is the amplitude of the first peak of the step response and xf is the settling amplitude.  Then the damping ratio is

See also 
 Damping factor

References

 

Kinematic properties
Logarithms